Michael Klitgaard Christensen (born 28 August 1990) is a Danish racing driver. He is currently competing in the FIA World Endurance Championship for Porsche in the GTE PRO class.

Early career

Karting
Born in Karlslunde, Christensen had a very successful karting career, winning the 2004 Nordic ICA Junior Championship. The following year he gathered both Nordic and European titles in ICA Junior class. For 2006 Christensen graduated to Formula A and he achieved a second place in the Formula A World Championship and was twice champion in the German Kart Championship Winner of the Macau Int. Kart Grand prix Formula A. In 2007 Michael repeated as German Kart Champion and also won the KF1 South Garda Winter Cup.

Formula BMW Europe
Christensen made his open-wheel racing debut in the 2008 Formula BMW Europe season at Barcelona which supported the 2008 Spanish Grand Prix, where he was involved in a potentially serious incident, flipping his car. He finished the season in sixth place and as the top rookie in the rookie standings.

He moved to Mücke Motorsport for the 2009 season. He started the season as the strongest candidate to win the championship, and a victory in the first race of the season was promising. He finished the season in fourth place, although he lost results from five races including three wins, after his team lost an appeal over a breach of technical regulations was rejected by the FIA.

GP3 Series
In 2010, Christensen became the first driver to join MW Arden for the 2010 GP3 Series season.

Sportscar career

Porsche
In 2012, Christensen joined the Porsche young driver program. He resulted 7th in the 2012 Porsche Carrera Cup Germany and 6th in the 2013 Porsche Supercup.

He became a factory driver in 2014, racing in the WeatherTech SportsCar Championship joining Patrick Long in the GTLM class, winning 12 Hours of Sebring and North American Endurance Cup. In 2015 he competed in the FIA World Endurance Championship together with Richard Lietz, joining the Manthey Racing team in the GTE-Pro class. Winning the manufactures championship, and finishing 3rd in the drivers championship. In the 2018-2019 FIA World Endurance Championship he in succeeded winning 24 Hours of Le Mans for Porsche.

Hypercar career
For the 2023 World Endurance Championship season, Christensen was named in the lineup for Porsche Penske Motorsport, partnering Dane Cameron and Frédéric Makowiecki.

Personal life
Christensen's hobbies are improving on personal fitness, and training, while his favourite driver is Michael Schumacher, and his favourite circuit is the Nürburgring.

Racing record

Career summary

† – As Christensen was a guest driver, he was ineligible for points.
* Season still in progress.

Complete GP3 Series results
(key) (Races in bold indicate pole position) (Races in italics indicate fastest lap)

Complete Porsche Supercup results
(key) (Races in bold indicate pole position) (Races in italics indicate fastest lap)

† As Christensen was a guest driver, he was ineligible to score points.

Complete IMSA SportsCar Championship results
(key) (Races in bold indicate pole position) (Races in italics indicate fastest lap)

* Season still in progress.

Complete FIA World Endurance Championship results

* Season still in progress.

Complete 24 Hours of Le Mans results

References

External links
 
 

1990 births
Living people
Danish racing drivers
Formula BMW Europe drivers
GP3 Series drivers
FIA Institute Young Driver Excellence Academy drivers
24 Hours of Daytona drivers
24 Hours of Le Mans drivers
Rolex Sports Car Series drivers
Porsche Supercup drivers
ADAC GT Masters drivers
WeatherTech SportsCar Championship drivers
FIA World Endurance Championship drivers
People from Greve Municipality
Arden International drivers
Porsche Motorsports drivers
Sportspeople from Region Zealand
ART Grand Prix drivers
Formula BMW Pacific drivers
American Le Mans Series drivers
Blancpain Endurance Series drivers
Double R Racing drivers
Josef Kaufmann Racing drivers
Mücke Motorsport drivers
DAMS drivers
KCMG drivers
Nürburgring 24 Hours drivers
Motaworld Racing drivers
Karting World Championship drivers
Team Penske drivers
Porsche Carrera Cup Germany drivers